Lasri or Lasry is a surname. Notable people with the surname include:

 Alex Lasry (born 1987), American businessman and basketball executive
 Gabi Lasri, Israeli footballer
 Hicham Lasri (born 1977), Moroccan film director and novelist
 Lex Lasry, Australian lawyer and judge
 Marc Lasry (born 1959), American businessman and hedge fund manager
 Yehiel Lasri (born 1957), Israeli physician and politician

Maghrebi Jewish surnames